With My Heart in Yambo is a 2011 Ecuadorian documentary film written and directed by María Fernanda Restrepo. The film documents the abduction of Restrepo's two brothers in 1988. In 2012 it won the Havana Star Prize for Best Documentary at the Havana Film Festival New York.

References

External links
 

2011 films
Ecuadorian documentary films
2010s Spanish-language films
2011 documentary films
Autobiographical documentary films
Documentary films about crime
Biographical documentary films
Films about kidnapping
Enforced disappearance